A Morning with Farah or Morning with Farah is a Pakistani Breakfast television show. The show originates from Islamabad and it is aired on a private television channel ATV from Monday to Friday from 09:05 AM to 10:00 AM Pakistan Standard Time. Farah Hussain is the host and executive producer and Zagham ul Islam is the director of the show.

Format 
Presented as a light interview chat show, each episode has a live telephone call and features personalities, fitness, self grooming and fashion tips, jewelry designs, recipes etc.

Celebrity guests 
Celebrities that have been featured on the show include: 

 Politicians
 Imran Khan
 Chaudhry Shujaat Hussain
 Ameen Faheem
 Javed Hashmi
 Firdous Ashiq Awan
 Khush Bakht Shujaat

 Actors
 Babrik Shah
 Mustafa Qureshi

 Musicians
 Mehdi Hassan
 Ghulam Ali
 Shaukat Ali
 Ali Haider
 Arshad Mahmood

 Health
Hakeem Rizwan Hafeez Malik

Celebration of Islamic festivals 
This show celebrates Islamic festivals like Ramadan, Jashne eid milad unnabi, Moharram with great respect.

References

External links 
 

Pakistani television talk shows